Indonesia–Slovakia relations refers to bilateral relations between Slovakia and Indonesia. The two countries established diplomatic relations in 1992, with the legal frameworks was inherited from the Czechoslovakia era. Indonesia has an embassy in Bratislava and Slovakia has an embassy in Jakarta. Both countries are members of the WTO and United Nations.

References

External links
Embassy of Indonesia in Bratislava, Slovakia
Embassy of Indonesia - Bratislava

 
Slovakia
Bilateral relations of Slovakia